Histura cuprata is a species of moth of the family Tortricidae. It is found in Guyana and Brazil (Federal District, Santa Catarina).

References

Moths described in 1917
Polyorthini